Ptychochromis curvidens is an endangered species of fish in the cichlid family. It is endemic to a few rivers that flow west from Montagne d'Ambre in far northern Madagascar. It is threatened by habitat loss and introduced species.

References

curvidens
Freshwater fish of Madagascar
Fish described in 2006
Taxonomy articles created by Polbot